Rice transitory yellowing virus (RTYV) is a plant pathogenic virus of the family Rhabdoviridae.

External links
ICTVdB - The Universal Virus Database: Rice transitory yellowing virus
Family Groups - The Baltimore Method

Nucleorhabdoviruses
Viral plant pathogens and diseases